Kerem Maharal (lit. Maharal Vineyard) is a moshav in northern Israel. Located near Atlit, on the southern side of Mount Carmel, it falls under the jurisdiction of Hof HaCarmel Regional Council.

History
The moshav was established in 1949 by group of Jewish Holocaust survivors from Czechoslovakia, who immigrated to Israel with the help of the Aliya movement after World War II.

Kerem Maharal was named after legendary 16th century Rabbi Judah Loew ben Bezalel, also known by the Hebrew acronym "Maharal" (Moreinu HaRav Loew, translated as Our teacher, the Rabbi Loew). It was built on the site of the depopulated Palestinian Arab villages of Ijzim and Khirbat Al-Manara, which were captured by the Israel Defense Forces in Operation Shoter during the 1948 Arab–Israeli War. The residents lived in the Arab stone houses until the 1960s and some of the original structures remain today.

Notable residents
Ami Ayalon, former head of Shin Bet

References

Czechoslovak Jews
Moshavim
Populated places established in 1949
Populated places in Haifa District
1949 establishments in Israel
Czech-Jewish culture in Israel
Slovak-Jewish culture in Israel